Rugotheca typica is a species of problematic tubular organism of the Cambrian. The species has been reported from China and Iran.

References

Cambrian life of Asia